The Parsippany-Troy Hills School District is a comprehensive community public school district serving students in pre-kindergarten through twelfth grade from Parsippany-Troy Hills Township in Morris County, New Jersey, United States. The Parsippany Troy-Hills School District serves students in ten elementary schools, two middle schools, two high schools and an adult education center. The community served by the district is ethnically, culturally and linguistically diverse. 

As of the 2018–19 school year, the district, comprising 14 schools, had an enrollment of 7,248 students and 643.8 classroom teachers (on an FTE basis), for a student–teacher ratio of 11.3:1.

The district is classified by the New Jersey Department of Education as being in District Factor Group "GH", the third-highest of eight groupings. District Factor Groups organize districts statewide to allow comparison by common socioeconomic characteristics of the local districts. From lowest socioeconomic status to highest, the categories are A, B, CD, DE, FG, GH, I and J.

Schools 
Schools in the district (with 2018–19 enrollment data from the National Center for Education Statistics) are:
Elementary schools
Eastlake Elementary School (350 students; in grades PreK-5)
Sebastian Powell, Principal
Intervale Elementary School (278; K-5)
Christopher Waack, Principal
Knollwood Elementary School (414; K-5)
Merisa Rosa, Principal
Lake Hiawatha Elementary School (408; PreK-5)
Steve Figurelli, Principal
Lake Parsippany Elementary School (283; K-5)
Steven Linzenbold, Principal
Littleton Elementary School (405; K-5)
Michele Hoffman, Principal
Mt. Tabor Elementary School (449; K-5)
Marlene Toomey, Principal
Northvail Elementary School (371; K-5)
 Dr. Natalie Betz 
Rockaway Meadow Elementary School (257; K-5)
Keith Cortright, Principal
Troy Hills Elementary School (260; K-5)
James Magli, Interim Principal
Brooklawn Middle School (918; 6-8)
 Carly Stout
Central Middle School (789; 6-8)
Mark Gray, Principal
High schools
Parsippany High School (913; 9-12)
 Dr. Denis Mulroony, Principal
Parsippany Hills High School (1,075; 9-12)
Dr. Matthew Thompson, Principal

Administration
Core members of the district's administration are:
Dr. Barbara Sargent, Superintendent
Robin Tedesco, Business Administrator / Board Secretary

Board of education
The district's board of education, with nine members, sets policy and oversees the fiscal and educational operation of the district through its administration. As a Type II school district, the board's trustees are elected directly by voters to serve three-year terms of office on a staggered basis, with three seats up for election each year held (since 2012) as part of the November general election.

References

External links 
Parsippany-Troy Hills School District

Parsippany-Troy Hills School District, National Center for Education Statistics
Daily Record Article on Excellence in Hiring

Parsippany-Troy Hills, New Jersey
New Jersey District Factor Group GH
School districts in Morris County, New Jersey